Mahru Rural District is a rural district (dehestan) in Zaz va Mahru District, Aligudarz County, Lorestan Province, Iran. At the 2006 census, its population was 2,023, in 344 families.  The rural district has 41 villages.

References 

Rural Districts of Lorestan Province
Aligudarz County